Murder Backstage is a 1960 Greek theatrical film noir film starring Alekos Alexandrakis, Maro Kontou, Hristos Tsaganeas, Titos Vandias, Aliki Georgouli, Georges Sarri and Dimos Starenios.  The writer was from the famous police novelist Giannis Maris.

Plot

A well known actress of the theatre is assassinated and the simultaneously one of these actors of the theatre escapes.  The police, along with the journalists of a newspaper company ask the edge of the filament for located the assassin. The action occurs during the occupation period of World War II.

Cast
Alekos Alexandrakis - Journalist Makris (Δημοσιογράφος Μακρής)
Titos Vandis - Officer Bekas (Αστυνόμος Μπέκας)
Maro Kontou - Elena Pavlidi (Έλενα Παυλίδη)
Aliki Georgouli - Mary Lambrinou (Μαίρη Λαμπρινού)
Zorz Sarri - Thaleia Halkia (Θάλεια Χαλκιά)
Christos Tsaganeas - Pavlos Stefanou (Παύλος Στεφάνου)
Efi Mella - Roza Delli (Ρόζα Δελλή)
Thanassis Mylonas - Haris Apostolidis (Χάρης Αποστολίδης)
Dimos Starenios - Stavros
Lavrentis Dianellos - barman
Sapfo Notara - cleaning lady
Vasos Andrianos
Dimitris Nikoalidis
Giorgos Damassiotis - doorman
Giorgos Belos
Gkikas Biniaris
Velisarios Kontogiannis

Awards
The movie was presented with the presentation of an American film noir that made it one of the greatest Greek movies of the time, it was awarded twice at the first Thessaloniki Film Festival in 1960 (see 1960 Thessaloniki Film Festival.

Photographer: Aristeidis Karydis-Fuchs
Second female role: Georges Sarri

External links
 
Egklima sta paraskinia at cine.gr

1960 films
1960 comedy films
1960s Greek-language films
Greek thriller films